Rosenblattichthys hubbsi, the Hubb's pearleye,  is a species of fish found worldwide. It is a part of Rosenblattichthys, a genus of pearleyes.

Size

Etymology
The fish is named in honor of ichthyologist Carl L. Hubbs (1894-1979), for his many contributions to the science of ichthyology.

References

Aulopiformes
Taxa named by Robert Karl Johnson
Fish described in 1974